Harriet White Medin (March 14, 1914 – May 20, 2005) was an American actress and dialogue coach who worked in Italian and American films. She appeared in the cult film Death Race 2000.

Early life
Born to Dr. and Mrs. Edward P. White of Winthrop, Massachusetts, Harriet, one of five children graduated from Winthrop High School in 1932 where she appeared in many school plays. She later performed in many amateur theatrical productions in the area. She graduated from The Forsyth Institute where she studied dentistry and worked for five years as a dental assistant where some of her patients included John F. Kennedy and Robert F. Kennedy.

Harriet moved to New York City to engage in work as an actress.  During World War II she became an entertainer with the United Service Organizations where she toured American military bases in the US and Europe as part of a production of Junior Miss.

Following the war she was one of a group of American actors recruited by Rod E. Geiger to go to Italy to film Paisan for Roberto Rossellini.  She remained in Italy to become one of the first American actresses who made Italian films in the postwar era.

Film career
Offered film work in Italy, Harriet met her director Roberto Rossellini and Paisan'''s dialogue coach Federico Fellini.

Harriet appeared in several films, acted as a dialogue coach, dubbed films into English and worked as a coach and personal assistant to Gina Lollobrigida.

She met Orson Welles on the set of Prince of Foxes (1949) with Welles hiring her to teach diction to the actress Lea Padovani who Welles wished to play Desdemona in his ongoing production of Othello (released in 1951). Harriet was originally to have played Emilia but the lengthy time of production led to her to drop out.

During this time she met and married her husband Gastone Medin and remained with him until they separated, but not divorced in 1964. In addition to dubbing Italian films in English, Harriet also acted as a dialogue coach and cast such films as Beat the Devil (1954) and The Hills Run Red (1966) as well as acting as a film extra. Harriet's last film in Italy was John Huston's Reflections in a Golden Eye (1967); she accompanied Gina Lollobrigida to America to coach her on The Private Navy of Sgt. O'Farrell (1968).

She stayed in Hollywood with her friend director Andrew Marton and his wife where she guest starred in several American television series and made several films. One was for John Landis (Schlock) who she knew through the Martons.  She believed she scored her role in Death Race 2000 when Shelley Winters turned down the role, with Harriet doing an impression of Eleanor Roosevelt.

Death
She died on May 20, 2005 of "natural causes" including a combination of Parkinson's disease, a mild stroke, some internal bleeding and other illnesses.

Filmography

 Paisan (1946) - Harriet - Nurse (episode IV: Firenze)
 Genoveffa di Brabante (1947) - Genoveffa di Brabante
 Black Magic (1949)
 Rapture (1950) - Nurse
 Quo Vadis (1951) - woman holding infant on balcony (uncredited)
 Ha da venì... don Calogero (1952)
 La Dolce Vita (1960) - Sylvia's Secretary (uncredited)
 The Horrible Dr. Hichcock (1962) - Martha, the Maid
 Panic Button (1962, released in 1964)
 The Eye of the Needle (1963) - Mother of Rosaria
 The Ghost (1963) - Catherine Wood, Housekeeper
 Black Sabbath (1963) - Neighbor (segment "La goccia d'acqua")
 The Cardinal (1963) - (uncredited)
 The Whip and the Body (1963) - Giorgia
 Hot Enough for June (1964) - Hotel Receptionist (uncredited)
 Blood and Black Lace (1964) - Clarissa
 The Murder Clinic (1966) - Sheena
 Your Turn to Die (1967) - Dr. Evans' assistant
 Death of a Gunfighter (1969)
 Squares (1972) - Hannah Rugh
 Schlock (1973) - Mrs. Blinerman (as Enrica Blankey)
 Death Race 2000 (1975) - Thomasina Paine
 The Captive: The Longest Drive 2 (1976) - Mrs. McMasters
 The Bermuda Triangle (1979, Documentary) - Frau Meise
 The Tenth Month (1979, TV Movie) - Mrs. Cox the Lawyer
 Murder Can Hurt You! (1980, TV Movie) - Great Lady
 Blood Beach (1981) - Ruth Hutton
 The Terminator (1984) - Customer #4
 The Witches of Eastwick (1987) - Woman at Market
 Big Bad Mama II (1987) - Hotel manager's wife 
 The Killing Time (1987) - Nell
 Daddy's Boys (1988) - Marriage Licensor's Wife
 False Arrest (1991, TV Movie) - Helen Phelps
 All I Want for Christmas (1991) - Mrs. Graff
 Those Secrets (1992, TV Movie) - Vivian
 Troublemakers (1994) - Elderly woman
 Things to Do in Denver When You're Dead'' (1995) - Old Woman

References

External links

1914 births
2005 deaths
20th-century American actresses
Actresses from Massachusetts
American expatriates in Italy
American film actresses
People from Winthrop, Massachusetts
21st-century American women